The Macau Football Association ( Pinyin: Àomén zúqiú zǒng huì) is the governing body of association football in Macau, China.

History
The Hong Kong–Macau Interport tournament, jointly organized by Hong Kong Football Association and Macau Football Association, has been played since 1937.

Macau first entered AFC Asian Cup qualification in 1980, winning their first international match against Philippines by 2–1 at Tokyo National Stadium.

On 6 December 2018, Benfica de Macau President Duarte Alves accused the Macau Football Association of neglecting club football in favor of the Macau national football team. It is the second time in just two years that the club has been barred from participating in the AFC Cup on account of an administrative error. He said that the embarrassing situation might have been avoided if the Macau FA had been more proactive in supporting club football. Duartes further complained that he thinks that the Macau FA is simply focused on fulfilling whatever is required to get the FIFA and AFC subsidies – for example, having the various league echelons.

On 27 June 2019, the FIFA Disciplinary Committee sanctioned the Macau Football Association for failing to play the second leg of their first-round match against Sri Lanka in the AFC’s 2022 FIFA World Cup preliminary competition, due to be played on 11 June 2019. FIFA declared a 3–0 forfeit victory for Sri Lanka, with the Macau Football Association also receiving a fine of CHF 10,000.

Association staff

Competitions

National division

First division
Liga de Elite

Lower divisions
2ª Divisão de Macau
3ª Divisão de Macau

National cup
Taça de Macau

See also
Macau national football team
Macau national under-17 football team
Macau national under-20 football team
Macau national under-23 football team
Macau women's national football team
Sport in Macau

References

External links

Macau at the FIFA website (archived 10 June 2007)
Macau at AFC site

Football in Macau
Macau
Sports organizations established in 1939
1939 establishments in Macau